Cusano may refer to:

 Biagio Cusano (died 1683), poet and law professor
 Cusano Milanino, in the Province of Milan, Lombardy
 Cusano Mutri, in the Province of Benevento, Campania
 Università degli Studi Niccolò Cusano, university
 William Cusano (1943–2012), Canadian politician

See also
 Vinnie Vincent (born Vincent John Cusano, 1952), guitarist and songwriter

Italian-language surnames